A dragstrip is a facility for conducting automobile and motorcycle acceleration events such as drag racing.  Although a quarter mile (1320 feet, 402 m) is the best known measure for a drag track, many tracks are eighth mile (201 m) tracks, and the premiere classes will run 1,000 foot (304.8 m) races. The race is begun from a standing start which allows three factors to affect the outcome of the race: reaction time, power/weight ratio, and traction.

Features
A dragstrip is a straight, purpose-built racetrack, typically an eighth, ten feet longer than three-sixteenths, or a quarter of a mile long (660/1,000/1320 feet, 201/304.8/402 m), with an additional shutdown area to allow vehicles room to stop after crossing the finish line. Common features also include a 'water box' where vehicles and motorcycles start their burnouts for tire clean-up and also to heat up their tires to improve traction. There is a set of lights known as a 'Christmas Tree' that counts down to the start. There are also return lanes for the vehicles to return from the end of the track to the pit area.

Vehicle equipment requirements 
Like all other motorsports, drag racing has many safety requirements for the vehicles that compete. These can be found in the applicable governing body's rule book. Most rules do not apply until the vehicle exceeds a specified time, such as 10.99 seconds. This allows anyone with a regular production vehicle to take part for very little cost, and encourages participation of many people who cannot afford a proper racing vehicle.  The grassroots efforts are primarily bracket racing cars.  Many classes allow drivers to drive their street cars and participate in an event.

Dragstrip locations

Quarter mile times
Acceleration times differ even between identical vehicles due to widely varying factors - vehicle tune, elevation, driver/rider differences, payload, track surface conditions, weather conditions.

All official records must be backed up within one percent during the same race meet in order to be claimed.  The official records for terminal velocity and elapsed time are different in the professional car categories, and only the elapsed time run (and respective speed of that run) is listed.  There have been some cases where a car has run faster than the official record, but because they were not backed up within one percent during the same meet, they are not recognised by the NHRA, IHRA, or FIA.  The Top Fuel record listed as the final quarter-mile record in IHRA prior to off-season rule change at the end of 2016-17 season that shortened Top Fuel to 1,000 feet.

See also
List of fastest production cars by acceleration

References

External links
 International Hot Rod Association (IHRA)
 National Hot Rod Association (NHRA, US)
 New Zealand Drag Racing Association (NZDRA)
 Online Database of 1/4 mile times (US)
 Australian National Drag Racing Association (ANDRA)